In six-dimensional Euclidean geometry, the 6-simplex honeycomb is a space-filling tessellation (or honeycomb). The tessellation fills space by 6-simplex, rectified 6-simplex, and birectified 6-simplex facets. These facet types occur in proportions of 1:1:1 respectively in the whole honeycomb.

A6 lattice 
This vertex arrangement is called the A6 lattice or 6-simplex lattice. The 42 vertices of the expanded 6-simplex vertex figure represent the 42 roots of the  Coxeter group.  It is the 6-dimensional case of a simplectic honeycomb. Around each vertex figure are 126 facets: 7+7 6-simplex, 21+21 rectified 6-simplex, 35+35 birectified 6-simplex, with the count distribution from the 8th row of Pascal's triangle.

The A lattice (also called A) is the union of seven A6 lattices, and has the vertex arrangement of the dual to the omnitruncated 6-simplex honeycomb, and therefore the Voronoi cell of this lattice is the omnitruncated 6-simplex.

 ∪
 ∪
 ∪
 ∪
 ∪
 ∪
 = dual of

Related polytopes and honeycombs

Projection by folding 

The 6-simplex honeycomb can be projected into the 3-dimensional cubic honeycomb by a geometric folding operation that maps two pairs of mirrors into each other, sharing the same vertex arrangement:

See also 
Regular and uniform honeycombs in 6-space:
6-cubic honeycomb
6-demicubic honeycomb
Truncated 6-simplex honeycomb
Omnitruncated 6-simplex honeycomb
222 honeycomb

Notes

References 
 Norman Johnson Uniform Polytopes, Manuscript (1991)
 Kaleidoscopes: Selected Writings of H. S. M. Coxeter, edited by F. Arthur Sherk, Peter McMullen, Anthony C. Thompson, Asia Ivic Weiss, Wiley-Interscience Publication, 1995,  
 (Paper 22) H.S.M. Coxeter, Regular and Semi Regular Polytopes I, [Math. Zeit. 46 (1940) 380–407, MR 2,10] (1.9 Uniform space-fillings)
 (Paper 24) H.S.M. Coxeter, Regular and Semi-Regular Polytopes III, [Math. Zeit. 200 (1988) 3-45]

Honeycombs (geometry)
7-polytopes